The Montana State Bobcats football program competes in the Big Sky Conference of the NCAA's Division I Football Championship Subdivision for Montana State University. The program began in 1897 and has won three national championships (1956, 1976, and 1984). It is the only college football program in the nation to win national championships on three different levels of competition, NAIA, NCAA Division II, and NCAA Division I-AA (now FCS). Through the 2022 season, the Bobcats had played in 1,049 games with an all-time record of 525–492–32.

The first championship came in Montana State's last season in the Rocky Mountain Athletic Conference, which moved to NAIA in 1952. The national championship was the first ever for the RMAC and was also the first time the NAIA had a football champion. The Bobcats were members of the RMAC from 1917 to 1956, after being an independent from 1897 to 1916. MSC rejoined the NCAA (College Division) in 1957, and had one of its most successful runs as an independent from 1957 to 1962 with six straight winning seasons, including an 8–2 mark in 1957 and 8–1 in 1958. In 1963, Montana State became a charter member of the Big Sky Conference and has since won two national championships.

Montana State has won 20 conference titles, including 15 in the Big Sky Conference and five in the Rocky Mountain Athletic Conference. The Bobcats have won conference titles in eight of the past nine decades and have won multiple conference titles in seven of the last eight decades. MSU finished the 1926 season undefeated in RMAC conference games, but was not awarded a conference title. They have qualified for the NCAA playoffs twelve times, once (1976) as a Division II member and eleven times (1984, 2002, 2003, 2006, 2010, 2011, 2012, 2014, 2018, 2019, and 2021) as a Division I-AA/FCS member.  Through the 2016 season, the Bobcats are 13–9–2 in postseason play.

Their primary rival are the Montana Grizzlies, whom they meet in the annual Brawl of the Wild, more commonly referred to as the Cat-Griz game by MSU students, alumni and supporters.

History

1946
Before World War II, Montana State football tasted success often, but in small doses. The Bobcats did not record a winning season between 1931 and 1941, MSC's last pre-war squad. The 'Cats were 1–10 in that stretch against Montana, and were shut out for eight consecutive years. In 1946, however, things began to change. Composed of war-hardened veterans, Clyde Carpenter and the Bobcats rolled up a 5–3–1 regular season record, impressive enough to land the team its first-ever bowl bid. The Bobcats tied New Mexico, 13–13. Although it would be seven more seasons until Montana State would again win more than it lost, that season helped chart the course into what would become an unbelievably successful period in Montana State's football history as the Bobcats would take 22 of the next 30 games from 1956 to 1985 from the Grizzlies and would win all three of their national championships during that same span.

The 1946 team was special for more than its accomplishments, however. When it reassembled following World War II, its special mission was to carry the Bobcat banner after 14 members of Montana State's previous team, the 1941 squad, were killed during World War II. The only pre-war regular to play in the Harbor Bowl was Bill Zupan, whose brother Al was among those 'Cat gridders making the ultimate sacrifice. Others were Orin Beller, Newell Berg, Dana Bradford, John Burke, Bernard Cluzen, William Coey, Karl Fye, John Hall, Joseph McGeever, John Phelan, Richard Roman, Wendell Scabad and Alton Zempel, according to the outstanding centennial history of MSU, "In the People's Interest".

1956 
In 1956, the Bobcats, led by freshman captain and two-way (center and middle linebacker) starter Sonny Holland, won a share of the NAIA title at the Aluminum Bowl in Little Rock, Arkansas, playing to a scoreless tie with the Pumas of St. Joseph's College from Rensselaer, Indiana.  The game was nationally aired on CBS television and radio.  It was played on a rain-soaked field that thwarted MSU's offense, which had run for an average of 323.1 yards rushing and 31.2 points per game. The championship was the first for the Rocky Mountain Athletic Conference and the 1956 Montana State football team is a member of the RMAC Hall of Fame. The 1956 Bobcats of head coach Tony Storti were the fourth, and last, Montana State football team to go undefeated. The game is the only blemish on the record of the team as it finished at 9–0–1.

1964 
Behind head coach Jim Sweeney in 1964, Montana State won the NCAA Western Regional College Division Championship, which existed from 1964 to 1972, with a 28–7 win over Sacramento State in what was also known as the Camellia Bowl. The NCAA Western Regional was one of four regionals that led up to the selection of the NCAA College Division champion by poll. However, neither MSU nor any of the other regional winners—Northern Iowa (Midwest), Middle Tennessee State (Mideast), or East Carolina (East)—were awarded the national championship. That distinction went in split fashion to Los Angeles State (UPI/Coaches) and Wittenberg (AP). Upon the establishment of Division II in 1973, a full playoff system was introduced to determine the national champion. MSU is one of three Big Sky Conference schools, along with Boise State and North Dakota, to win a Camellia Bowl game. The Bobcats finished the 1964 season at 7–4.

1976 
Montana State won the 1976 NCAA Division II championship at the Pioneer Bowl in Wichita Falls, Texas, beating the Akron Zips 24–13. The Bobcats were led by head coach Sonny Holland and sophomore quarterback Paul Dennehy. MSU led 17–0 in the third quarter before Akron cut the lead to 17–13. Running back Tom Kostrba scored from seven yards out in the fourth quarter to seal the win.

The Bobcats advanced to the championship game with a 17–16 quarterfinal win over the New Hampshire in Bozeman. The extra-point attempt to tie the game with seven minutes remaining missed wide right, and the remainder of the game was scoreless. That was followed by a 10–3 semifinal win in the Grantland Rice Bowl over North Dakota State, after trailing 3–0 at halftime on the road in Fargo.  Kostrba ran for 100 yards in both playoff games and Don Ueland ran for 94 in the championship game. Montana State finished the 1976 season with ten consecutive wins and a 12–1 record; the lone loss at Fresno State came in September.

1984 
Eight years later, the Bobcats defeated Louisiana Tech 19–6 in the Division I-AA Championship Game in Charleston, South Carolina, for their third national championship.  Led by second-year head coach Dave Arnold, MSU was seeded third in the twelve-team playoffs, which meant a first-round bye and a home game in the quarterfinals, in which the Bobcats rallied from a 0–14 deficit to eliminate Arkansas State 31–14.

In the semifinals, also in Bozeman, Montana State trailed second-seeded Rhode Island 12–20 entering the fourth quarter, then scored twenty unanswered points to win 32–20. MSU took the lead on a 97-yard interception return for a touchdown by safety Joe Roberts Jr. Quarterback Kelly Bradley threw for over 300 yards in each playoff game and had eight touchdown passes in the postseason. Tight end Joe Bignell hauled in 10 passes for 130 yards and two touchdowns in the championship game.

After a 2–2 start, the Bobcats won ten straight to end at 12–2 in 1984, which followed a 1–10 season in 1983, and preceded a 2–9 record in 1985.

Three Titles in three divisions 
Montana State holds the distinction of being the only college football program with national championships in three levels of college football.  The Bobcats of head coach Tony Storti claimed a share of the 1956 NAIA title when it finished in a scoreless tie with St. Joseph's (Indiana). In 1976, Sonny Holland's MSU team downed Akron 24–13 for the NCAA Division II championship, and the Bobcats won the NCAA Division I-AA (FCS) championship in 1984 under Dave Arnold with a 19–6 win over Louisiana Tech.

10,000 passing; 1,000 rushing quarterbacks 
In the history of college football, including the NAIA, there have been just 11 quarterbacks that have gone over 10,000 yards passing and 1,000 yards rushing for their career. Two of those quarterbacks were produced by Montana State. Travis Lulay accomplished the feat in 2005 when he finished with 10,746 passing and 1,459 rushing. DeNarius McGhee hit those milestones on consecutive weeks in 2013 when he went over 1,000 rushing against Northern Arizona, then hit 10,000 passing against Weber State. He finished his career with 1,133 yards rushing and 11,203 yards passing. Both quarterbacks began playing their freshman season at Montana State. Lulay started the sixth game of his freshman year against Idaho State. After a 2–4 start, he led the Bobcats to the Big Sky regular season championship and their first trip to the playoffs in 18 years. McGhee started the first game of his frosh season and has only missed two games – both in his senior year. He led MSU to Big Sky titles and the FCS playoffs the first three years of his career.

Back-to-back Bucks 
MSU is one of just three schools to have repeat winners of the Buck Buchanan Award, which is given out annually by The Sports Network to the most outstanding defensive player in the Football Championship Subdivision.

In 2012 Caleb Schreibeis became the first Bobcat to win the award followed by Brad Daly in 2013. Both players manned the defensive end (Bandit) position for MSU and racked up big numbers playing in defensive line coach Bo Beck's system.

The two players took completely different routes to the award as Schreibeis, a walk-on out of Billings West, didn't get on the list until the last week of the season and Daly, a highly touted prospect out of Helena Capital, was on the list all season.

The Stuff 
On November 17, 2018 at approximately 3:19 in the afternoon at Washington-Grizzly Stadium in Missoula with Montana State clinging to a 29-25 lead after rallying from a 22-0 deficit and rival Montana sitting within one foot of the Bobcats goal line with 14 seconds to play, defensive tackle Tucker Yates of Colstrip, Mont. jarred the ball loose from UM's Adam Eastwood and Grant Collins of Bozeman, Mont. sent the ball rolling into the UM backfield where Derek Marks of Belgrade, Mont. pounced on the ball to seal the win for the Bobcats.  MSU's other defensive tackle Chase Benson of Helena, Mont. knocked his man so far into the UM backfield that Eastwood had to alter his course causing him to collide with Yates. Bobcat fans have since referred to the play as The Stuff or The Montana Stuff in reference to the four Montana natives who played key roles in the play.

Earlier in the quarter Collins had forced and recovered a fumble in UM territory to set up the go-ahead touchdown. The Bobcats trailed by 15 points in the fourth quarter and outscored the Grizzlies 29-3 after falling behind 22-0.  The overall comeback is the greatest in Cat-Griz Game history and the fourth quarter comeback matched the comeback from a 24-9 deficit by the 1968 Bobcats, which ended in a 29-24 win over UM.

Conference affiliations
 Independent (1897–1916, 1957–1962)
 Rocky Mountain Athletic Conference (1917–1956)
 Big Sky Conference (1963–present)

Championships

National championships

Conference championships
Montana State has won 22 (five in the Rocky Mountain Athletic Conference (per RMAC website); 17 in the Big Sky Conference) conference championships through the 2022 season.

† Co-champions
‡ Montana and Montana State tied for the 2011 championship, which Montana subsequently vacated

Postseason results

Bowl results

NCAA Division II playoff results

NCAA Division I FCS playoff results
NCAA Division I FCS playoff results (known as "Division I-AA" from 1978 through 2005)

Montana State is 14–11 all time in the FCS playoffs and has won the national championship once, in 1984.

† 1984 final game held on neutral site at Johnson Hagood Stadium in Charleston, South Carolina. 2021 final game held on neutral site at Toyota Stadium in Frisco, Texas.

Head coaches

Rivalries

Montana 

The Brawl of the Wild is the game between MSU and their primary rival, the University of Montana Grizzlies. Both teams play for The Great Divide Trophy. As of 2016, Montana holds a healthy 72–41–5 lead in the series, but the series has been tight since 1956 with UM holding just a 32–31 lead; however, there was a notable losing record in the 1990's where MSU failed to win a single game.

The series has three distinct periods. From 1897 to 1916 the teams didn't belong to a conference and at times would play twice per year.  Early seasons had seven games or less with one season seeing the Grizzlies play just one game. Four of the five ties in the series came during this era. Montana won 12 games to Montana State's 7.

In 1917 Montana State joined the Rocky Mountain Athletic Conference and in 1924 Montana joined  the Pacific Coast Conference, the predecessor of today's Pac-12.  The RMAC included several teams that would become Mountain West members. When MSU joined the RMAC it included Colorado, Colorado State, Utah, Utah State, and Brigham Young. The RMAC would drop down to the small college division of NCAA football in 1939 and remained there until 1952 when it joined the NAIA.

UM joined the PCC after spending 22 years as part of the Northwest Intercollegiate Athletic Association with league members Washington, Oregon, Washington State, Oregon State, Idaho and Wittman College in 1924. By then the PCC included Stanford, California, UCLA, USC, Oregon, Oregon State, Washington, Washington State, and Idaho.  The Bobcats remained in the RMAC through 1956, while the Grizzlies continued in the PCC through 1949 and joined the Skyline (aka Mountain States) Conference, which also competed in the NCAA University (large) Division, from 1951–1961. MSU was a NAIA independent from 1957–1962 and UM was an NCAA University Division (large) independent in 1950 and 1962. During this period UM enjoyed a 30–8–1 edge in Cat-Griz games.

Both schools entered the Big Sky Conference as charter members in 1963 with Montana holding a 42–15–2 series lead, but the Bobcats winning five of the previous seven. From 1963 to 1985 Montana State enjoyed its most successful period of the Cat-Griz rivalry. MSU won 17 games to just six for UM. Following that Montana started "The Streak" when it won 16 straight games from 1986 to 2001. MSU ended the drought by winning three of four, the series is tied at 8-8* after "The Streak."  The Big Sky era shows Montana with a 30-26 lead.

Since MSU won its first national championship in 1956, the series shows UM with a 32–31 edge. Prior to that UM had a 40–10–5 advantage.

Bobcat Stadium

The Bobcats play their home games at Bobcat Stadium, located at the south end of campus in Bozeman.  The stadium and area around the stadium have been under vast renovations and improvements with approximately $14.3 million invested over the past five years.

In 2013, the stadium's parking lots were paved, landscaped, and had lighting installed to enhance the pre-game tailgating experience. During and following the 2011 season, stadium lighting was added and its first night game was in 2012 against Chadron State on Thursday, August 30. MSU renovated the south end zone in 2011, adding 5,277 seats to bring the official seating capacity to 17,777. The Cat-Griz game against Montana in 2013 set a stadium record with an attendance of 21,527. The new end zone seating holds over 7,200 fans. Included in the 2011 upgrades were an 18' x 37' LED video board, two scoreboards, and sound system. In 2008, the natural grass playing surface was replaced with FieldTurf. In the late fall of 2011, Montana State raised funds for stadium lighting in order to extend the hours it can practice and play night games. Seven light standards were erected around the stadium. MSU currently has plans to renovate the east grandstand to include matching sky suites of the west grandstand and erect seating in the north end zone. These additions would increase seating capacity to approximately 24,000. Fund-raising isn't expected to go public until 2015.

Prior to the 2011 addition, Bobcat Stadium was renovated in 1997 when the west grandstand was removed and replaced with a new grandstand with luxury sky suites, indoor stadium seating, press box, and club room. The north bleachers were also removed at this time and replaced with locker rooms for visitors, game officials, and an auxiliary locker room for the Bobcats. The name of the stadium was changed from Reno H. Sales Stadium to Bobcat Stadium at this time. The stadium capacity dropped from 15,000 to 12,500 due to the reconfiguration.

Reno H. Sales Stadium was erected in 1973 and replaced Gatton Field. Through the 1971 football season, the Bobcats played home games for four decades at Gatton Field. It was located directly south of the Romney Gym, across Grant Street and northeast of the Brick Breeden Fieldhouse, which opened in 1957. The playing field ran east–west and had lighting as far back as the 1940s. It was razed in early 1972 and is the site of the Marga Hosaeus Fitness Center, opened in 1973. Bobcat Stadium is approximately a half mile (0.8 km) due south.

The field was named for Cyrus J. Gatton (1894–1918), a former Montana State football player from 1913–16. A native of Iowa who was raised in Bozeman, Gatton enlisted in the U.S. Army Air Service during World War I and was killed while flying for the French on November 4, 1918, just a week before the Armistice. The class of 1917 voted in 1920 that when the school built a new football field it should be named for Cyrus Gatton, and the request was honored ten years later.

MSU played its 1972 season at Bozeman High School's Van Winkle Stadium, with expanded temporary seating. Despite the temporary relocation, the Bobcats still won the Big Sky Conference title that season.

National Award Winners

AFCA Coach of the Year
Dave Arnold (1984) Division I-AA

Liberty Mutual Coach of the Year
Rob Ash (2011) FCS

First Team All Americans
Montana State has seen 29 players receive First Team All-America recognition, with 22 of those earning consensus All-America status based on being selected to the first team of three or more recognized All-America teams.

In 1954, Jim Argeris became the first player selected as a first team All-America. Center Sonny Holland is the only three-time honoree and running back Don Hass the only two-time honoree. MSU had seven first team selections from 2009 to 2012, which is the most of any four-year span in school history.

In 2012 quarterback DeNarius McGhee, outside linebacker Jody Owens, and defensive end Caleb Schreibeis were selected to one or more of the various 2012 All-America first teams. McGhee is the first quarterback, Owens is the third linebacker, and Schreibeis the fifth defensive end in MSU history to receive the honor.  2012 marked the second time that MSU has had three All-America selections in one season.  The other time it occurred was when 1984's national championship team saw defensive end Mark Fellows, punter Dirk Nelson, and offensive tackle Bill Schmidt selected.

In 2013, Brad Daly became the seventh defensive lineman to earn All-America status. Daly joined Bill Kollar, Les Leininger, Mark Fellows, Neal Smith, Dane Fletcher, and Caleb Schreibeis. Daly also joined punter Matthew Peot as the only unanimous All-America selections in school history.

Notable players

First Team All-Americans

(*)unanimous selection

Other All-Americans
 Wayne Purdon, LB, 1966 (CP-2nd Team)

Retired numbers 

Sonny Holland is considered the greatest Bobcat football player in school history. The Butte native joined the program in 1956, and starting at center as a true freshman, helped lead Montana State to its first national title when it tied St. Joseph's in the first NAIA championship game 0–0.  He would earn first team All-America honors in 1957, 1958 and 1959 and is the only MSU player to do so three times. As a player, his teams never lost to rival Montana beating the Grizzlies 33–14, 22–13, 20–6, and 40–6, with Holland manning both the center and middle linebacker positions in most of those games.

Holland returned to MSU as an assistant coach and became the head coach in 1971. After a disappointing 2–7–1 first season that included his only loss to Montana as a player or head coach, he went on to finish .500 or better in each of the next six years, and set a school record with 47 wins. After a humiliating 30–0 loss to UM in 1971, Holland's teams rattled off wins of 21–3, 33–7, 43–29, 20–3, 21–12, and 24–19 against their rivals. The highlight of his coaching career was the 1976 team, which won the NCAA Division II national championship with a 24–13 victory over the Akron Zips. In 11 games against Montana as a player and head coach Holland went 10–1 outscoring the Grizzlies 277–142. Holland's No. 52 football jersey is one of four retired by Montana State University.

A running back from 1964–67 nicknamed the Iron Tumbleweed, Don Hass is one of only two players in MSU history to receive first team All-America status twice, and is the only MSU player to be named a first team NCAA All-America twice.  Hass set the game (298), season (1,460), and career (2,954) rushing records for the Bobcats during his four years. His 298 yards in a single game in 1966 against Weber State is still the top single game performance in school history.

While that game stands out, his best performances were against the Grizzlies.  He led them to wins in 1965 and 1966. In 1965, he ran for 100 yards for the first time in his career, and finished with 129 yards in a 24–7 win. In 1966 he ran for 142 yards in a 38–0 rout in Missoula.  He ran for a Cat-Griz record 209 yards against Montana in 1967, leading the Bobcats to a 14–8 win. All told he had 480 yards rushing in three games against Montana, all wins.

The Montana State football jersey with number 21 is retired in his honor and hangs inside Bobcat Stadium.

Dennis Erickson was a MSU quarterback from 1966 to 1968. He was also a head coach in college and professional football from 1982 to 2011.

In 1968, Erickson engineered the greatest comeback, in what is considered by many as the most exciting game in the Cat-Griz series. In all, 34 points were scored in the final quarter. Erickson, flanker Ron Bain, and running back Paul Schafer led the comeback, as the Bobcats clinched a tie for the Big Sky championship—their third straight. Bain's brother, Doug of the Grizzlies, gave Montana a 17–9 lead early in the quarter on a pass from Ray Brum. After another UM touchdown made the score 24–9 with just over 10 minutes to go it looked as if the Grizzlies would win going away, but the Bobcats weren't done. Schaefer scored on a short run with 8:15 to play and Erickson hit Bain for a touchdown with five minutes left cutting the lead to two at 24–22. The Grizzlies appeared to have the winning drive stopped at the MSU 32, but a facemask penalty gave the Cats new life on the 17.  Scoring 20 points in the last nine minutes, Montana State won 29–24 when Schafer, who had 58 carries for 234 yards in the game, dove into the end zone with 12 seconds left.

After Schafer's go-ahead touchdown with 12 seconds to play, the Grizzlies nearly spoiled things for MSU. After a touchback on the kickoff, UM takes over at the 20 with speedy receiver Ron Baines at quarterback. He gains 15, and another 15 are tacked on by an unnecessary roughness penalty to stop the clock with three seconds to go. Baines then makes a circus run of 37 yards from midfield before he's dragged down at the MSU 13 after time expires.

Bobcat QB Dennis Erickson was the difference. "Erickson killed us," UM head coach Jack Swarthout said.

Erickson led Montana State to three straight (1966, 1967, 1968) Big Sky Conference championships, and a spot in the 1966 College Division Western Regional (Camellia Bowl), where the Bobcats lost to the San Diego State Aztecs 28–7.

He went on to coach the Miami Hurricanes to two NCAA Division I-A national championships. He also had college head coaching stints with the Idaho Vandals, Wyoming Cowboys, Washington State Cougars, Oregon State Beavers and Arizona State Sun Devils. Professionally, he was the head coach of the NFL's Seattle Seahawks and San Francisco 49ers.

One Montana State Bobcat has been inducted into the Pro Football Hall of Fame: Jan Stenerud. After coming to MSU from Norway on a ski jumping scholarship, Stenerud starred on the varsity team, having a then-NCAA record 59-yard field goal against rival Montana in 1965. Stenerud scored 82 points as a senior in 1965. He was drafted by the Kansas City Chiefs in the third round of the AFL's 1966 draft.  In 1970, he kicked a then-Super Bowl record 48-yard field goal in Kansas City's 23–7 Super Bowl IV win. He would later go on to play for the Green Bay Packers and Minnesota Vikings earning seven All-Pro and three All-AFL selections, and four trips to the Pro Bowl in his 19 seasons as a professional. He was inducted in 1991 and is the only pure kicker in the Pro Football Hall of Fame. Stenerud's name is in the Kansas City Chiefs' ring of honor, and he is one of just four MSU players to have his number, "78" retired.

Super Bowl players

Six Montana State graduates have played in a Super Bowl. The most recent is Mike Person. Dane Fletcher, who was a linebacker for the New England Patriots, in Super Bowl XLVI. The first was Stenerud in Super Bowl IV, followed by Ron East, who played defensive tackle the following year in Super Bowl V for the Dallas Cowboys. Sam McCullum was a wide receiver for the Minnesota Vikings in Super Bowl IX against the Oakland Raiders. Running back Tony Boddie played in Super Bowl XXII for the Denver Broncos. Travis Jonsen earned a Super Bowl ring as a practice squad player for Tampa Bay.

Travis Lulay
In 2011, quarterback Travis Lulay was named the Most Outstanding Player in the Canadian Football League and led the British Columbia Lions to the Grey Cup title, garnering the game's Most Valuable Player award in the 34–23 win over Winnipeg. The Lions started the season 0–5 before winning 13 of their last 15 games to win the championship. Lulay threw for a league-high 32 touchdowns and passed for 4,815 yards to finish with the second best passer rating in the CFL.  He also ran for 391 yards (8.3 per carry), which was good for 12th in the CFL and was the most by a quarterback.

Lulay was the quarterback at MSU from 2002–2005 leading the Bobcats to three Big Sky Conference titles and two NCAA Division I-AA playoff appearances. All three Big Sky Conference championships were taken in the last game of the season with wins over rival Montana.  As a true freshman, Lulay engineered MSU's 10–7 win over the Grizzlies in Missoula, ending UM's 16-game winning streak over the Bobcats, and was named the Big Sky Conference's Newcomer of the Year. Lulay led Montana State in rushing his senior year with 611 yards. He left with school records for career passing yards (10,746–11th in NCAA Division I-AA history), single-season total offense, and total offense in a career. He graduated with a 3.91 GPA.

He played briefly for the Seattle Seahawks and New Orleans Saints of the NFL and also played in the NFL Europa for two seasons.

Bill Kollar 
In 1974 Kollar became the first small college (non-FBS) player to win the Senior Bowl MVP, and is one of only two (Portland State's Neil Lomax being the other) small college players to win the award in that game's history. Kollar became one of just four Big Sky Conference players ever selected as an NFL first round draft choice when he was taken by the Cincinnati Bengals in 1974. He went on to play eight seasons in the NFL, including five with the Tampa Bay Buccaneers. He has been an NFL defensive line coach since 1990 and currently coaches in that capacity for the Denver Broncos. He is a member of the Senior Bowl and MSU Hall of Fames, and his number "77" is one of only four football numbers retired by MSU. Don Haas, Holland and Stenerud are the others.

Caleb Schreibeis 
Following the completion of the 2012 NCAA FCS regular season, Schreibeis was named the winner of Buck Buchanan Award given annually by The Sports Network to the most outstanding defensive player in the FCS. It was the first such distinction for a Montana State player. He was also a consensus All-America in 2012, the 20th Bobcat to attain that status.

Schreibeis came to Montana State as a walk-on in 2008, and after red-shirting for one season, eventually worked his way into a starting position for one game as a sophomore in 2010. He became a full-time starter in 2011 and was selected as an honorable mention to the All-Big Sky team.

The 2012 season was a breakout campaign for Schreibeis. In 10 regular-season games, the team captain collected 51 tackles and led the Big Sky with 12 sacks. He ranked first on his team in tackles for loss (14.5), quarterback hurries (seven) and forced fumbles (seven), which was also the top mark in the nation. The Bobcats also won their third straight Big Sky Conference title that season.

Brad Daly 
Brad Daly garnered the 2013 Buck Buchanan Award and the FCS Athletics Directors Association Award, and is perhaps the best pure pass rusher in MSU history.  Along with the two defensive player of the year awards, he was also a finalist for the Ted Hendricks Award, given to the best defensive end in all divisions of college football. He finished fifth in the final voting.

He made an immediate impact as a true-freshman, despite playing sparingly, as he recorded two sacks and blocked two kicks, leaving observers to speculate that he would have a great career. Daly left football after that season, only to return a year later with a renewed vigor.

In his sophomore year, he proved his worth by leading the Big Sky Conference with 12.5 sacks as a situational pass rusher. As a junior he became a full-time defensive end, but suffered a severely sprained ankle, and dropped to just 5.5 sacks. A year later he bounced back, despite nagging injuries, to lead the nation in sacks with 14 sacks and 20.5 tackles for loss.

For his career Daly finished with 34 sacks. He was also a unanimous first team All-America selection and the Big Sky Conference defensive player of the year as a senior.  He was voted a team captain prior to his senior season, joining his father J and brother Bobby as MSU team captains and All-Americans.  Bobby Daly was sixth in the 2007 Buck Buchanan Award voting.

Bobcats in the pros

National Football League
Ken Amato, Carolina Panthers (2002-2003), Tennessee Titans (2003–2011)
 Troy Andersen, Atlanta Falcons (2022- )
 Bob Banaugh, Minnesota Vikings (1972)
 Tony Boddie, Denver Broncos (1986-1987)
 Jon L. Borchardt, Buffalo Bills (1979-1984), Seattle Seahawks (1985-1987)
 Ron East, Dallas Cowboys (1967-1970), San Diego Chargers (1971-1973), Cleveland Browns (1975), Atlanta Falcons (1976), Seattle Seahawks (1977)
Dane Fletcher, New England Patriots (2010–2014, 2015) Tampa Bay Buccaneers (2014)
 Daniel Hardy, Los Angeles Rams (2022 - )
Sean Hill, Miami Dolphins (1994–1996), Detroit Lions (1997)
Travis Jonsen, Tampa Bay Buccaneers (2020-2021) Detroit Lions (2021)
 Kevin Kassis, Seattle Seahawks (2022 - )
 Lewis Kidd, New Orleans Saints (2022 - )
 Bill Kollar, Cincinnati Bengals (1974-1976), Tampa Bay Buccaneers (1977-1981)
Sam McCullum, Minnesota Vikings (1974–1975, 1982–1983), Seattle Seahawks (1976–1981)
 Lance McCutcheon, Los Angeles Rams (2022- )
 Mark McGrath, Seattle Seahawks (1980-1981), Washington Redskins (1983-1985)
Zach Minter, Chicago Bears (2013), Cincinnati Bengals (2014), Dallas Cowboys (2014)
Mike Person, San Francisco 49ers (2011, 2018–2020), Indianapolis Colts (2012, 2017–2018), Seattle Seahawks (2012–2013), St. Louis Rams (2013–2014), Atlanta Falcons (2015–2016), Kansas City Chiefs (2016–2017), Indianapolis Colts (2017–2018)
Frosty Peters, Providence Steam Roller (1930), Portsmouth Spartans (1930), Brooklyn Dodgers (1931) and Chicago Cardinals (1932)
Larry Rubens, Green Bay Packers (1982–1983), Chicago Bears (1986–1987)
Beau Sandland, Carolina Panthers (2016), Green Bay Packers (2016-2017), Arizona Cardinals (2018), Oakland Raiders (2019)
Alex Singleton, Seattle Seahawks (2015), New England Patriots (2015), Minnesota Vikings (2015), Philadelphia Eagles (2019 - 2021, 2021 team captain), Denver Broncos (2022)
 Jan Stenerud, Kansas City Chiefs (1967–1979), Green Bay Packers (1980–1983), Minnesota Vikings (1984–1985)
 Joey Thomas, Green Bay Packers (2004-2005), New Orleans Saints (2005), Dallas Cowboys (2007), Miami Dolphins (2008-2009), Oakland Raiders (2010)
 Corey Widmer, New York Giants (1992-1999)
Travis Lulay, Seattle Seahawks (2006, 2008), New Orleans Saints (2008)
Mike McCleod, Green Bay Packers (1984-1985)

NFL Europe 

 Travis Lulay, Berlin Thunder (2007)

American Football League
 Bob Cegelski, C Denver Broncos (1962)
 Curt Farrier, DT Kansas City Chiefs (1963–1965)
 Cliff Hysell, OT Denver Broncos (1966)
 Ron Warzeka, DT Oakland Raiders (1960)

United States Football League
 Tony Boddie, RB Los Angeles Express (1983–1985)
 Phil Bruneau, DT Oklahoma Outlaws (1984), Arizona Outlaws (1985)
 Jim Kalafat, LB San Antonio Gunslingers (1983)
 Larry Rubens, C Memphis Showboats (1985)

World Football League
 Ron East, DT The Hawaiians (1974)

United Football League 

 Bob Cegelski, C Louisville Raiders (1962)

Canadian Football League
 Reggie Carthon, Shreveport Pirates (1995), BC Lions (1996, 1999), Winnipeg Blue Bombers (1997-1998)
Les Kaminski, Hamilton Tiger-Cats (1984), Calgary Stampeders (1984)
 Bob Lubig, Calgary Stampeders (1978-1981, 1982-1985), Toronto Argonauts (1981), Montreal Alouettes (1986)
 Travis Lulay, BC Lions (2009-2018)
 Mike McCleod, Edmonton Eskimos (1980-1984)
 Zach Minter, BC Lions (2015), Calgary Stampeders (2016), Saskatchewan Roughriders (2017–present)
Dakota Prukop, Toronto Argonauts (2017-2019), Calgary Stampeders (2020), Edmonton Elks (2021-present)
 Alex Singleton, Calgary Stampeders (2016-2018)
 Brian Strong, Calgary Stampeders (1983-1985), Hamilton Tiger-Cats (1986)
 Al Wilson, BC Lions (1972-1986)
 Harvey Wylie, Calgary Stampeders (1956-1964)

Hall of Fame inductees

Pro Football Hall of Fame

One Montana State Bobcat has been inducted into the Pro Football Hall of Fame; this was Jan Stenerud. After coming to MSU from Norway on a ski jumping scholarship, Stenerud starred on the varsity team with a then-NCAA record 59-yard field goal against rival Montana and 82 points scored as a senior in 1965. He was drafted by the Kansas City Chiefs in the third round of the AFL's 1966 draft. Stenerud scored 11 points, including a then-Super Bowl record 48-yard field goal, in Kansas City's 23–7 Super Bowl IV win in 1970. He would later go on to play for the Green Bay Packers and Minnesota Vikings earning four trips to the Pro Bowl in his 19 seasons as a professional. He was inducted in 1991 and is one of only two pure kickers in the Pro Football Hall of Fame, the other being Morten Andersen. Stenerud's name is in the Kansas City Chiefs' ring of honor and he is one of just four MSU players to have his number "78" retired.

Canadian Football Hall of Fame
Al Wilson
Wilson was elected to the Canadian Football Hall of Fame on September 20, 1997, following a long career as an offensive lineman with the British Columbia Lions. The guard and center was awarded All-Western All-Star and All-Canadian All-Star honors for seven years, 1975–81. He was voted the Schenley Most Outstanding Offensive Lineman in 1977. He played in two Grey Cup games (1983 and 1985), and was a key member of B.C.'s 1985 championship team.

Harvey Wylie
Wylie was elected to the Canadian Football Hall of Fame on May 24, 1980. The former Bobcat All-America was a standout defensive back and kick return specialist for nine years with Calgary. He played for the Calgary Stampeders from 1956–64, and for five straight years was an All-Western All-Star and twice was an All-Canadian All-Star.

Future non-conference opponents 
Announced schedules as of December 7, 2022

References

External links

 

 
1897 establishments in Montana
American football teams established in 1897